Bulow Plantation Ruins Historic State Park is a Florida State Park in Flagler Beach, Florida. It is three miles west of Flagler Beach on CR 2001, south of SR 100, and contains the ruins of an ante-bellum plantation and its sugar mill, built of coquina, a fossiliferous sedimentary rock composed of shells. It was the largest plantation in East Florida, and was operated with the forced labor of enslaved Africans and African Americans.

History
The plantation was developed beginning in 1821 by Major Charles Wilhelm Bulow, who acquired 4,675 acres on a tidal creek (later Bulow Creek). He had 2,200 acres cleared by the labor of his enslaved workforce for the cultivation of commodity crops: indigo, cotton, rice, and sugarcane. At his death in 1823, his seventeen-year-old son, John Joachim Bulow inherited the property and managed it. At Christmas 1831 into January 1832, Bulow hosted the artist and naturalist John James Audubon, who explored the area in his continuing study of American birds. About that time, Bulow had a sugar mill constructed on his property. The plantation was destroyed in the Seminole War of 1836.

The property and ruins were acquired by the State of Florida in 1945 and dedicated as a State Historic Park in 1957. It was added to the National Register of Historic Places on 29 September 1970.

Fauna
Among the wildlife of the park are bald eagles, swallow-tailed kites, and Florida manatees.

Recreational activities
Activities include hiking, fishing, wildlife viewing, canoeing and kayaking, and picnicking. Amenities include a 6.8 mile hiking trail, a boat ramp, and a screened picnic pavilion. Bulow Creek is recognized as a State Canoe Trail. The park's interpretive center features original artifacts and exhibits about the Bulow Plantation.

Hours
The park is open between 9:00 AM and 5:00 PM Thursday through Monday. Bulow Plantation Ruins Historic State Park is closed on Tuesdays and Wednesdays.

Gallery

References

External links

 Bulow Plantation Ruins Historic State Park at Florida State Parks
 Bulow Plantation Ruins State Historic Site at Absolutely Florida

Archaeological sites in Florida
State parks of Florida
Parks in Flagler County, Florida
Houses on the National Register of Historic Places in Florida
Ruins in the United States
Sugar plantations in Florida
Museums in Flagler County, Florida
History museums in Florida
Protected areas established in 1957
Florida Native American Heritage Trail
Houses in Flagler County, Florida
National Register of Historic Places in Flagler County, Florida
Parks on the National Register of Historic Places in Florida
1957 establishments in Florida
Buildings and structures in Flagler County, Florida
Slave cabins and quarters in the United States
Forts in Florida
Second Seminole War fortifications